Peter Francis (born 22 December 1936) is a Kenyan middle-distance runner. He competed in the men's 800 metres at the 1964 Summer Olympics. He won a bronze medal in the 800 metres at the 1965 All-Africa Games.

References

1936 births
Living people
Athletes (track and field) at the 1964 Summer Olympics
Kenyan male middle-distance runners
Olympic athletes of Kenya
Athletes (track and field) at the 1962 British Empire and Commonwealth Games
Athletes (track and field) at the 1966 British Empire and Commonwealth Games
Commonwealth Games competitors for Kenya
African Games bronze medalists for Kenya
African Games medalists in athletics (track and field)
Place of birth missing (living people)
Athletes (track and field) at the 1965 All-Africa Games